Wilf Mayer (18 February 1912 – April 1979) was an English professional footballer who played at inside-right for Southampton in the late 1930s, before joining Wellington Town where he won a Welsh Cup winner's medal in 1940.

Football career
Mayer was born in Stoke-on-Trent, and after playing for local works teams, Newcastle PSA and Downings Tileries, he signed as a professional with Stoke City in August 1932. Mayer spent most of his career at Stoke in the reserves, making only one first-team appearance in the 1934–35 season which came in a 1–0 defeat at home to Chelsea on 9 March 1935.

In March 1937, he was one of the first signings by Southampton's new manager Tom Parker for a fee of £650. A nippy forward, at home both on the wing or at inside-forward, Mayer was immediately drafted into the first-team to replace the injured Dick Neal. Although Neal returned after a few matches, Mayer retained the inside-right shirt for the remainder of the season.

In the following season, the signing of players such as Ray Parkin and Ted Bates restricted Mayer's appearances to five matches. Mayer was placed on the transfer list at a fee of £500, but the club were unable to attract any offers from Football League teams even when the fee was later halved.

Eventually, Mayer joined Wellington Town of the Cheshire County League, remaining with them long enough to win a Welsh Cup winner's medal in 1940 when they defeated Swansea Town 4–1.

Career statistics
Source:

Honours
Wellington Town
Welsh Cup winner: 1940

References

1912 births
1979 deaths
Footballers from Stoke-on-Trent
English footballers
Association football forwards
English Football League players
Stoke City F.C. players
Southampton F.C. players
Telford United F.C. players